Bygalorie is a village in Lachlan Shire Council, Central West, New South Wales Australia. It is located at 33°27S 54°S and  146°47′04'E.

It is in Gipps County and on the Lake Cargelligo railway line.

References

Towns in New South Wales
Towns in the Riverina